The Big Wedding is a 2013 American comedy film written and directed by Justin Zackham. It is an American remake of the original 2006 Swiss-French film  (My Brother is Getting Married), written by Jean-Stéphane Bron and Karine Sudan.

The film stars a large ensemble cast including Robert De Niro, Katherine Heigl, Diane Keaton, Amanda Seyfried, Topher Grace, Ben Barnes, Susan Sarandon and Robin Williams. It was released on 26 April 2013 by Lionsgate in the United States and Canada.

Plot
Don and Ellie Griffin were a New England couple married for twenty years before they divorced. They have three children from their marriage – Lyla, Jared, and adopted son Alejandro, who originates from Colombia.

In preparation for Alejandro's wedding, Ellie arrives at Don's (and her old) home and lets herself in. She interrupts Don just as he is about to perform oral sex on Bebe, his girlfriend of eight years (and Ellie's former best friend). All are embarrassed, but they make small talk, and he shows Ellie to her room. Meanwhile, Alejandro and his fiancée, Missy, are meeting with Father Moinighan, the priest who will be marrying them. It is revealed that Alejandro's biological mother, Madonna, is going to be coming from Colombia to the wedding, which upsets Alejandro since he does not have a "traditional" family, and his Catholic mother would not approve of that or the fact that Don and Ellie had been divorced.

Lyla, who reveals she is separated, goes to the hospital and, after passing out briefly, sees her 29-year-old brother Jared, an obstetrician. They talk and it is revealed that he is a virgin and is waiting for the "right one". Back at home, Alejandro tells Ellie that his mother is coming to the wedding. Explaining that since she is a devout Catholic and doesn't believe in divorce, Alejandro asks Ellie and Don to pretend to be married for the next three days. Hearing this, Bebe becomes upset with Don and leaves the house. Madonna arrives with Alejandro's biological 20-year-old sister, Nuria. Later, Nuria flirts with Jared, after she brazenly strips naked to skinnydip in the family's lake as he watches.

That evening, the family goes out to dinner with Missy and her parents Muffin and Barry, and Bebe shows up as their waitress, which surprises everyone. Meanwhile, Nuria starts fondling Jared under the table, and Ellie sees Nuria giving Jared a handjob. She takes Nuria to the restroom for a chat, telling her that American women behave differently with men. When they arrive home, Jared tells Nuria he wants to have sex, as she had suggested earlier, but she tells him "No", asking him instead to do romantic things for her such as read her poetry. Don and Ellie, meanwhile, end up having sex after Ellie, still pretending to be Don's wife, sleeps in Don's room.

Ellie and Madonna go for a walk in the woods and talk. Neither understands the other's language, though they think they are communicating on some level. At the same time, Don and Lyla talk privately and Lyla reveals she is pregnant. On the wedding day, before the ceremony, Don tells Bebe he had sex with Ellie. Bebe says she forgives them but then punches him in the face. She also reveals that Ellie cheated on Don with Missy's father before Don cheated on her. Muffin says that she knows about Ellie and Barry, and tells them that she is bisexual, implying that she is interested in a sexual affair with both Bebe and Ellie. Meanwhile, Missy and Alejandro have decided to get married on the family dock to escape the chaos. The family runs after them and, after some of them fall into the lake, the wedding reception is on.

During the reception, Jared goes upstairs to talk to Nuria, who tells him she has decided to no longer follow Ellie's advice (about not being so available sexually), and they sleep together. Back at the reception, Ellie and Bebe have made up. Don surprises Bebe by proposing to her, and they get married on the spot. Lyla's husband Andrew arrives at the wedding and, upon finding out that Lyla is pregnant, reconciles with her. Alejandro's mother realizes she has been lied to about his family, and he runs after her as she starts to leave. But she reveals that her own past was not as pure as he thought, that she too had lied to protect him, and she forgives him.

Time passes and it is revealed that Lyla has had a daughter named Jane, as Don attaches a plaque with her name to their family tree.

Cast
 Robert De Niro as Donald Robert "Don" Griffin
 Diane Keaton as Eleanor "Ellie" Griffin
 Katherine Heigl as Lyla Griffin
 Topher Grace as Jared Griffin
 Ben Barnes as Alejandro Soto Griffin
 Susan Sarandon as Beatrice Martha "Bebe" McBride
 Amanda Seyfried as Melissa "Missy" O'Connor
 Christine Ebersole as Muffin O'Connor
 David Rasche as Barry O'Connor
 Ana Ayora as Nuria Soto
 Patricia Rae as Madonna Soto
 Robin Williams as Father Bill Moinighan
 Kyle Bornheimer as Andrew
 Megan Ketch as Jane

Production
The film was previously titled The Wedding. It is an American remake of the original 2006 French film,  (My brother is getting married), which was written by Jean-Stéphane Bron and Karine Sudan.

Principal photography took place in Greenwich, Connecticut. Locations included St. Agnes Church in Greenwich, Christ Church, Greenwich, Gabriele's Italian Steakhouse, and a private home in the town's Stanwich section.

Director Justin Zackham and producer Clay Pecorin appeared on a season 6 episode of TLC's Cake Boss. They ordered the wedding cake for the film from Buddy Valastro at Carlo’s Bakery in Hoboken, New Jersey.

In reference to the scene where her character jumps into a lake naked, Ana Ayora said, "There was definitely a little bit of anxiousness, but that was Nuria. Nuria wouldn't hesitate, so I didn't hesitate."

Reception
The film received largely negative reviews. The Big Wedding holds a 7% rating on Rotten Tomatoes based on 111 reviews, with an average rating of 3.19/10. The website's critical consensus states, "The Big Weddings all-star cast is stranded in a contrived, strained plot that features broad stabs at humor but few laughs." On Metacritic, the film has a score of 28/100 based on reviews from 32 critics, indicating "generally unfavorable reviews". One observer pointed out that The Big Weddings reviews are among the worst of the year. Lou Lumenick of the New York Post wrote, "'I'd rather gouge my eyes out with hot spoons!' De Niro exclaims at one point. I'm not sure exactly what he was talking about, but I'd like to think it referred to the prospect of being forced to watch The Big Wedding."

According to business outlets, the movie "was a massive flop at theaters", even though it recouped its production costs by a few million dollars. It opened with box-office receipts of $7.5 million at 2,633 North American locations, leading one observer to state, "Expect domestic exhibitors to file for divorce in the very near future." Another commentator stated that "There's little reason to suspect it will stick around any longer than theater owners are contractually obligated to keep it."

Heigl was nominated for Worst Supporting Actress at the 34th Golden Raspberry Awards in 2013, where she lost to Kim Kardashian for Temptation: Confessions of a Marriage Counselor.

References

External links
 
 
 
 

2013 films
2013 comedy films
American comedy films
2010s English-language films
Comedy of remarriage films
Films about weddings in the United States
Films set in Connecticut
Films shot in Connecticut
Lionsgate films
American remakes of French films
Films scored by Nathan Barr
2010s American films